Thomas Rotter (born 27 January 1992) is an Austrian professional footballer who plays as a centre-back for Austrian Football Bundesliga club TSV Hartberg.

Club career
He made his Austrian Football First League debut for TSV Hartberg on 28 September 2012 in a game against SC Austria Lustenau.

References

External links
 

1992 births
Living people
Austrian footballers
TSV Hartberg players
Austrian Regionalliga players
2. Liga (Austria) players
Austrian Football Bundesliga players
Association football defenders